The third season of The Bellflower Bunnies, a children's animated series based on the Beechwood Bunny Tales books by Geneviève Huriet and Loïc Jouannigot, began airing on France's TF1 network on 4 April 2007. The episodes are directed by Eric Berthier, produced by Patricia Robert, and written by Valérie Baranski.

This season consists of twenty-six episodes, During April and May 2008, all of them were first broadcast on Kinderkanal (KI.KA), a German children's station; episodes 27–38 first aired in France from April 4 to July 4, 2007, episodes 39–45 aired from July 6 to August 24, 2008, episodes 46–50 from December 22, 2008, to January 2, 2009, and episodes 51 and 52 on July 12 and July 13, 2010, respectively. In July and August 2008, most of those were broadcast on the French-language channel TFO in Ontario, Canada.

Production
As with season 2, The Bellflower Bunnies is a co-production of France's TF1, Euro Visual, Big Cash and Walt Disney Television, and Canada's Tooncan. Newcomers to the series included the Département de la Charente, Région Poitou-Charentes, and Peter Scheede Animation of Saint-Yrieix-sur-Charente.

Production of this season began in 2005, and ended around early 2007. Returnees included director Eric Berthier, producer Patricia Robert, writer Valérie Baranski, executive co-producer Paul Cadieux, and executive producers Yves Pont and Franck Algard.

Episodes
Each episode in this season runs 22 minutes in length. Except for "Les Passiflore à la mer" (based on an original Beechwood Bunny Tale), the episodes are based on original scripts by Valérie Baranski. The English titles for this season's episodes come from broadcasts on other countries, such as TVP1 in Poland and Boomerang in Latin America/Brazil.

The 38th episode in the official order, "Le violon du marais," aired in France before #37, "L'expédition glaciale." On KI.KA's list, however, "La reine des corsaires" ("Das Geheimnis von Schloss Meadow") comes at #37, while "L'expédition glaciale" is placed at #39 instead.

Note: O = Corresponds to the official order as listed by Institut National de l'Audiovisuel (INA) and AnimezVous.com. B = Corresponds to TF1's broadcast schedule. Numbers to the right refer to their positions in this season.

DVD releases
Beez Entertainment and Seven Sept released the first DVD of this season on 4 November 2008, as La Famille Passiflore: Les Nouvelles Aventures. Like the second season discs, the original French versions are paired with their English dubs.  Another volume was released on January 6, 2009., the two DVDs include five episodes each. No new volumes of this season have been released since then.

See also
 List of The Bellflower Bunnies episodes

References
General

Some French titles were provided by TFO's schedules during its summer 2008 run.

Specific

External links
 The Bellflower Bunnies at TF1.fr

Official sites for the DVD distributors, Beez Entertainment and Seven Sept

2007 Canadian television seasons
2007 French television seasons